The Looj was a rain gutter (eavestrough) cleaning domestic robot made and sold by iRobot.

The Looj was not an autonomous robot, but rather a remote-controlled robot patterned after a toy tank with a power drill mounted on the front.

Description
It had long treads on its side which allowed it to move inside the gutter, and an auger attached to its front. The auger, spinning flexible flaps at 500 RPM, dislodged and removed debris inside the gutter by flinging it sideways into the air. The device also had a detachable handle/remote, that was used to carry and operate the robot.

The first Looj models were powered by an internal 7.2 V NiCad rechargeable battery, which must be removed for charging. Later models use a Li-ion rechargeable battery instead.

The Looj was discontinued in 2017.

Critical reception
The Looj was received favourably by reviewers prior to release. Crunch Gear said "If you place your ladder at a corner of the house – and your gutters are wide enough – you can easily clean out two sides of a house in a few minutes."

Looj won the Best of CES Innovations Award: Home Appliances in 2008.

References

External links 
 Looj product page

IRobot
Domestic robots
2000s robots